The Philippines competed at the 2022 ASEAN Para Games in Surakarta, Indonesia. Originally scheduled to take place in Vietnam in 2021, The games were planned amidst the COVID-19 pandemic, posing logistical challenges in organizing the event.

Originally scheduled to be held from 17 to 23 December 2021, games were cancelled in October 2021 after the 2021 Southeast Asian Games was postponed to May 2022 due to the pandemic.

The delegation which consist of 144 athletes, 38 coaches and 40 officials is led by chef de mission Walter Torres.

Medalists

Gold

Silver

Bronze

Multiple Medalists

Medal summary

Medal by sport

Medal by date

Wheelchair basketball

5x5 basketball

3x3 basketball
The Philippine men's 3x3 began their campaign with a 15–10 over host Indonesia and which was followed by a lost to Thailand and a win against Cambodia the following day. The men's team advance to the gold medal match but settled for silver in a second game against Thailand. The women's team on the other hand lost their first two games to Thailand and Laos on the first day of competition. The team failed to win over Laos in the bronze medal game.

Powerlifting 

The Philippines entered three athletes for Powerlifting.

References

ASEAN Para Games
2022 ASEAN Para Games
Indonesia 2022
ASEAN Para Games, 2022